Rayleigh Urban District was an urban district in the county of Essex, England. It was created in 1929 by the merger of the civil parishes of Rayleigh and Rawreth, both previously in the Rochford Rural District.

Since 1 April 1974 it has formed part of the District of Rochford.

Political history of Essex
Districts of England abolished by the Local Government Act 1972
Urban districts of England
1929 establishments in England
Rayleigh, Essex